Repast is the official quarterly publication of the Culinary Historians of Ann Arbor (CHAA), founded in June, 1987. The CHAA had been founded in 1983 by Jan Longone.

Repast publishes articles and book reviews on food history as well as covering CHAA activities.

External link
 Official website
 Archive of back issues

Food and drink magazines
Quarterly magazines published in the United States
Magazines established in 1987
Magazines published in Michigan
History magazines published in the United States
History of food and drink
Mass media in Ann Arbor, Michigan